Filattiera is a comune (municipality) in the Province of Massa and Carrara in the Italian region Tuscany, located about  northwest of Florence and about  northwest of Massa.

Main sights
Church of San Giorgio (12th century). It contains a rare tombstone from 752 remembering the work of a Lombard bishop credited with sweeping off paganism in the area. The church has an aisle with apse (another aisle was destroyed in the 12th century), and a bell tower, also from the 12th century.
Romanesque church of San Giovanni Battista, at Dobbiana. The façade is made of sandstone. The interior is in Baroque style.
Medieval pieve of St. Stephen, at Sorano, known from 1148.

References

Cities and towns in Tuscany